Water Pump is a neighborhood in the Karachi Central district of Karachi, Pakistan. It is near the main water pump that supplies fresh water to the city of Karachi.

Demography 
Ethnic groups in Water Pump include Sindhis, Kashmiris, Seraikis, Pakhtuns, Balochis, Memons, Bohras and Ismailis.

Places 
Yousuf Plaza is located near Water Pump. It has around 1200 apartments and a population of more than 10,000 residents. The MH Academy of English is also situated at Yousuf Plaza FB Area. Other landmarks around Water Pump include Mamji Hospital, Anarkali Market and Haji Health Club.
Anarkali Bazar, Water Pump market, Nawaz Court,

See also
Karachi Central District

References

External links 
 Karachi Website.

Neighbourhoods of Karachi
Gulberg Town, Karachi
Karachi Central District